Tamakovo (Tamaq) is a rural locality (a village) in Moskovsky Selsoviet, Dyurtyulinsky District, Bashkortostan, Russia. The population was 38 as of 2010. There is 1 street.

Geography 
Tamakovo is located 33 km southeast of Dyurtyuli (the district's administrative centre) by road. Imay-Utarovo is the nearest rural locality.

References 

Rural localities in Dyurtyulinsky District